Photinus  or Photeinos ('bright') is a Greek given name.

It is commonly associated with Photinus of Sirmium (died 276), a Christian bishop and heresiarch.

Other people with the name include:

 Photinus of Thessalonica (fl. late 5th century)
 Photeinos (strategos) (fl. 820s), Byzantine commander

See also 
 Photios (name)
 Fotino (disambiguation)
 Photinus (beetle), genus of fireflies